Glory of Iqbal is a book written by Abul Hasan Ali Hasani Nadwi to introduce the poet Muhammad Iqbal to the Arab world. It was first published in Arabic language as Rawa-e Iqbal. It was translated into Urdu by Shams Tabriz Khan as Nuqoosh-i Iqbal. It is among the famous work of Nadwi, well accepted across the Muslim world, particularly in India and Arab world.

References

External links 

Indian books
History of Islam
Books by Abul Hasan Ali Hasani Nadwi
Works about Muhammad Iqbal
Deobandi literature